Hector MacLean may refer to:

Clan Chiefs
Many chiefs of Clan Maclean have been called Hector or Eachann, including:
 Red Hector of the Battles Maclean (1368–1411), 6th Clan Chief, killed at the Battle of Harlaw, also known as "Red Hector"
 Hector Odhar Maclean (?–1513), 9th Clan Chief, also known as "Hector the Sallow" 
 Hector Mor Maclean, 12th Chief (1497–1568), 12th Clan Chief, also known as "Hector the Great"
 Hector Og Maclean, 13th Chief (c. 1540–1573), also known as "Hector the Younger"
 Hector Og Maclean, 15th Chief (1583–1623), 15th Clan Chief
 Hector Og Maclean of Brolas (1600s), son of Donald Maclean, 1st Laird of Brolas and grandson of Hector Og Maclean, 15th Chief 
 Hector Mor Maclean, 16th Chief (c. 1600–1626), 16th Clan Chief
 Sir Hector Maclean, 2nd Baronet (c. 1620–1651), 18th Clan Chief, killed at the Battle of Inverkeithing
 Sir Hector Maclean, 5th Baronet (c. 1700–1750/1), 21st Clan Chief
 Sir Hector Maclean, 7th Baronet (1783–1818), 23rd Clan Chief
 Hector Maclean, 4th Laird of Coll (fl. 1560)
 Hector Roy Maclean, 5th Laird of Coll, son of the 4th laird of Coll
 Hector Roy MacLean of Coll (1600s), son of John Garbh Maclean, 7th Laird of Coll
 Hector Maclean, 2nd Laird of Torloisk
 Hector Reaganach Maclean, 1st Laird of Lochbuie

Others
Hector Maclean (politician) (1751–after 1799), English-born soldier, farmer and political figure in Nova Scotia
Hector Maclean (folklorist) (1818–1893), story collector for John Francis Campbell
Hector Lachlan Stewart MacLean (1870–1897), Scottish recipient of the Victoria Cross
Hector MacLean (RAF officer) (1913–2007), Battle of Britain fighter pilot